Jurzyn may refer to the following places:
Jurzyn, Żagań County in Lubusz Voivodeship (west Poland)
Jurzyn, Żary County in Lubusz Voivodeship (west Poland)
Jurzyn, Masovian Voivodeship (east-central Poland)